4 O'Clock Club is a British comedy drama and musical children's television series set in a secondary school, which premiered on 13 January 2012 on CBBC. A second series began airing on 4 January 2013, and the third series premiered on 20 December 2013. Series 4 began airing on 28 January 2015, and Series 5 was aired on CBBC from February to May 2016. The sixth series was aired on CBBC from March to May 2017.

The show's seventh series started airing on 24 January 2018 and ended on 18 April 2018. Series 8 began on CBBC with a Christmas special on 19 December 2018, continued airing on CBBC from 6 February 2019, and ended on 17 April 2019. Series 9 began airing on 4 February 2020, concluding on 21 April 2020.

Background
In March 2011, auditions were held for 4 O'Clock Club, and the show was publicly announced the next month. In January 2012, the first episode aired, with the series wrapping up in March of the same year. Since 2011, nine series have been produced, filming annually in the summer months.

Synopsis

Series 1 (2012)
The first series centres on Josh Carter (Khalil Madovi), a pupil at Elmsbury High, and his older brother Nathan (Ben Bailey “Doc Brown” Smith), who works as a teacher there. Josh is portrayed as a laid-back teenage schoolboy trying to maintain his cool reputation, while also being rebellious and trying to cause trouble in order to achieve his goals and humiliate or outsmart Nathan. Nathan, a former Elmsbury High student and famous rapper, soon learns that only he will be able to stop Josh from his schemes.

Series 2 (2013)
In the second series, Nathan leaves Elmsbury to go to scotland and new music teacher Dexter Harris (Jason Callender) joins the school. Dexter becomes Josh and his mother's new lodger, taking Josh's room as a result. As such, Josh hates Dexter through much of the series, until he finally accepts his presence and labels him as an "honorary Carter brother". The series also featured Crispin Bell (Simon Lowe) as the new headmaster, who replaces Byron, and proved to be far stricter than Byron. Mr Bell was a brutal enemy of Josh and Dexter for the remainder of the series. Issac (Layton Blake) made a guest and a 1st appearance in Series 2 Episode 1 but his name wasn't confirmed and the credits say "Fowlmere Josh". Josh is 14 in this season.

Series 3 (2013–2014)
The third series featured Nathan's proposal and marriage to Melanie Poppy (Laura Aikman), who both departed the series, and Josh is forced to share his room with his annoying younger cousin, Nero (Akai). When the school burns down due to an issue with candles, Elmsbury is merged with another school, Fowlmere Manor, renaming the school Elmsmere Manor as of the fourth episode of the third series. Molly, Ryan and Miss Andress (until episode 13) do not appear in the rest of the series and attend a new school off-screen, known as Gosset High with Miss Anita Andress as the Headteacher of Gosset High.

Due to the merger, several new characters joined the series in episode three, these were PE teacher Mr Nunn (Dan Wright), Miss Parkwood (Sophia Di Martino) and pupils in Nero's year; Eli Grant (Daniel Kerr), Owen Garland (Lewis Brindley), Fleur Murphy (Chloe Davison) and Eleesha Rahad (Grace McIntosh). Sally Ann Matthews also joined the cast as headteacher Aine O'Brien and a pupil in Josh's year: Isaac Rodgers (Layton Blake) who is now part of the main cast. The series also has Bebe Johnson who is the secretary for Elmsmere Manor as well as the mother of Nero.

Series 4 (2015)
The fourth series features Nero, now in the main role, and his crew have replaced Josh and the Elmsbury gang who have all temporarily departed the series (except Isaac, who becomes Elmsmere's caretaker) and Dexter is trying to make it as an accomplished teacher but is given the new job of taking care of Nero's shenanigans, which indirectly resembles Josh and Nathan's relationship in the first series. The teachers who appeared in Series 3, Miss Parkwood and Aine O'Brien do not appear in this series, leading to the reintroduction of former head teacher Anita Andress (Liz Hume-Dawson).

The series also introduced a new main character, rebellious and cynical tomboy Clem Burton (Jade Alleyne), who joins Nero's crew as well as mysterious spray paintings of Andress appear around Elmsmere, called 'The Phantom Sprayer', however it was later revealed that it was Mr Bell who was the criminal. A new love interest for Dexter, Science teacher Lizzie Baker (Sarah Schoenbeck), is introduced in episode one.

A new recurring character, Isobel Harlow (Ruby Barnhill) appears from episode three. This series also features mini cameos from Josh's gang as shown in the series premiere and series finale. Nathan also makes his comeback in two episodes and is now a father to baby Moses.

Series 5 (2016)
In the fifth series, all the characters from the fourth series remain apart from Miss Andress, but with three new characters, Lizzie's younger sister Amber (Ella Marshall Pinder) and her friends Violet (Cara Jenkins) and Darnesh (Riley McCormick) who want to fit in with the "cool" kids, like Nero and his gang. Zoe-Marie's younger sister Ingrid (Zara Thurstan) also starts at the school and quickly becomes Amber's enemy. A new head teacher is also introduced in the first episode, Mrs Helena Goodman (Victoria Carling).

Throughout the series, both Nero and Clem try to tell each other how they feel about each other. Dexter and Lizzie are dating but must hide it from others, though Mr Nunn (Dan Wright) tries to hit on Lizzie. Amber, and her gang try to beat their bully Ingrid and Dexter and Nero face problems living together.

Series 6 (2017)
In the sixth series, Nero and Clem have finally begun dating after their summer romance, but eventually break up after several arguments. Clem departs in episode three to pursue a career in music. Dexter and Lizzie are expecting a baby, and eventually give birth to twins named Albert and Faraday. After his divorce in the previous series, and a brief relationship with newcomer Anastasia (Rachel Elizabeth Kelly), Bell finds himself living in a run-down caravan on the school grounds with his estranged son CJ (Rufus King-Dabbs), a newcomer to the series.

Dexter and Nero are both shocked at CJ's arrival, as Bell never mentioned in any previous series that he had a child. The series also introduces the characters of Polly Morgan (Mischa Eckersley), a fellow pupil of Nero's whom he tries to impress throughout the series and Owen's younger brother Chester (Rohan Green). In Series 6, Isobel Harlow was promoted to a series regular as she appeared in every episode.

Series 7 (2018)
The seventh series started airing on 24 January 2018. All the main characters from the previous series returned apart from Isobel Harlow (Ruby Barnhill). Elmsmere School has moved to a new location after debt caused the old school to be closed. Mr Bell becomes stand-in headteacher, while Helena Goodman takes time off to reflect on the financial issues of the old site. She returns for the final four episodes of the season. Nero's character departs in the fourth episode to pursue new experiences in America along with Dexter and Lizzie. 3 new characters were introduced also in the 4th episode: Science teacher Maddie Harper (Genesis Lynea), her son Jack Harper (Ashton Henry-Reid) and Music teacher Danny Boyd (Nathan Clarke).

Series 8 (2018–2019)
The eighth series began with a special for Christmas on 19 December 2018, focusing on Mr Bell and his relationship with his son CJ. The rest of the series began on CBBC on 6 February 2019 and was on the BBC iPlayer every Wednesday from 5:00 pm. Evan (Zak Sutcliffe) was introduced in this series as a 6th former student who is also a rebel. Nero returns as a guest on the 100th episode special which was the 9th Episode in the 8th Series. All the cast from the previous series return, with Mrs Goodman (Victoria Carling) leaving in episode four.

Series 9 (2020)
The ninth series began airing on 4 February 2020. This series saw a mini-reboot. PC Emily Rowe (Leah Hackett) who has appeared since the second series becomes a series regular. New characters Coco (Carys John) and Reiss (Aled Arhyel) were introduced as PC Rowe's niece and nephew, and are put into the care of Rowe after their mother is arrested. They are joined by new classmates Henry (Finley Allgrove) and Magnus (Harley Harrison). New music teacher Clinton Russell (Andy Umerah) was introduced as well, who replaces Danny, and also dates PC Rowe.

All the cast return from the previous series, with the exception of Maddie and Jack Harper (Genesis Lynea and Ashton Henry-Reid), Eli Grant (Daniel Kerr) and Mr Danny Boyd (Nathan Clarke) who all have left the series off-screen. Episode three sees a new member of staff, Miss Wrigley (Holly Freeman), join the series. Episode five saw Mr Nunn (Dan Wright) learn that new pupil Henry is his son. Zoe-Marie Ingham (Ruby Morgan) returned in episode 7.

This series saw the final appearances of CJ and Crispin Bell Bell (Rufus King-Dabbs and Simon Lowe) episodes 4 and 10 respectively and Owen (Lewis Brindley), Fleur (Chloe Davison), Eleesha (Grace McIntosh), Katie (Jasmine Payne), Polly (Mischa Taylor Eckersley) and Evan (Zak Sutcliffe) in episode 13 as they left sixth form. CJ Bell returned in episode 10 as part of a rap, and Crispin Bell returned in episode 13 for a guest appearance.

This series concluded on 21 April 2020 with the final two episodes being aired back-to-back on CBBC.

Cast

Main characters

Recurring and guest characters

Past characters

Timeline

4 O'Clock Files
4 O'Clock Files is a spin off from 4 O'Clock Club, following Josh Carter's departure for Hillview Academy. Set during the end of term at Elmsmere, it focuses on Crispin Bell, filming a documentary with the help of Fleur Murphy. He focuses on Elmsmere's curriculum, sporting activities and education, and also discusses the history of Elmsmere, about how Elmsbury and Fowlmere merged.

The series features clips from the second and third series, as the many topics of the documentary are discussed. The series also features Nero and his friends, who discuss the events of the third series. Isaac and Ash made their final appearances in Elmsmere uniform, discussing Josh's mishaps with Rachel and the adventures they had in Elmsbury and Elmsmere.

Dexter and Nunn were also caught teasing each other, at the expense of Dexter's end of year reports, whom he did Josh's and Zoe-Marie's reports. Josh is absent from the series (due to his departure for Hillview). He only appears in clips from previous series.

The programme aired on CBBC, between 14 and 19 December 2014.

Production
Constructed raps are featured in every episode, usually relating to the current situation. As such, the series takes a musical style. Since the show began, all series have been filmed on location in Greater Manchester. For the first series, filmed in 2011, 4 O'Clock Club was filmed in a secondary school that is still in use: Smithills School, in Bolton.

The second series was filmed at Offerton High School (now Fairway Primary School) in Stockport in 2012, which was also used briefly in 2013 for the third series. From 2013 to 2016, the series was filmed in the former site of St Ambrose Barlow RC High School in Swinton. They also briefly used the former site of Radcliffe Riverside High School, in Radcliffe, for some indoor and playground scenes.

As of the seventh series, the show is filmed in the former site of St George's Roman Catholic High School in Walkden.

References

External links

2012 British television series debuts
2020 British television series endings
2010s British children's television series
2020s British children's television series
British children's musical television series
Fictional schools
English-language television shows
Musical comedy television shows
CBBC shows
BBC children's television shows
Television series by BBC Studios